Ramu is a village in Bangladesh. It is the headquarters of Ramu Upazila, Cox's Bazar District. It is located on the Baghkhali River, approximately sixteen miles from Cox's Bazar, between Cox's Bazar and Chittagong.

Ramu has Mosque, pagodas, Buddhist monasteries, and a bronze Buddha statue that is 13-feet in height.

Villagers
Ramu villagers are craftspeople that produce handicrafts, and are also weavers.

See also
 List of villages in Bangladesh

References

Villages in Cox's Bazar District
Villages in Chittagong Division